Bill is a 1981 American made-for-television biographical drama film starring Mickey Rooney and Dennis Quaid based on the life of Bill Sackter. The film was broadcast on CBS on December 22, 1981. 
A sequel, Bill: On His Own, was released in 1983. Writer/filmmaker Barry Morrow, portrayed in the film by Dennis Quaid, based the story on his life experiences with Sackter, and later became his legal guardian. Sackter, who did not have autism, would also serve as a partial inspiration for the character of Raymond Babbitt in Morrow's early draft screenplay for the 1988 film Rain Man.

Awards
Mickey Rooney won an Emmy Award and Golden Globe for his performance, and the film also received a Golden Globe for Best TV Film.

Premise
Bill is a man with an intellectual disability in his 60s. He ventures out into the world for the first time after spending most of his life at Grandville, a dreary inner city institution in Minneapolis, Minnesota, since age seven (when his mother sent him there). Bill is taken in by a kind family and learns what it means to love for the first time in his life.

Cast
Mickey Rooney - Bill Sackter 
Dennis Quaid - Barry Morrow
Largo Woodruff - Beverly Morrow 
Anna Maria Horsford - Marge Keating 
Harry Goz - Dr. Tom Walz 
Kathleen Maguire - Florence Archer

See also
Film within a film
Rain Man

References

External links
The Bill Sackter Story official website

1981 television films
1981 films
1980s biographical drama films
American biographical drama films
CBS network films
Best Miniseries or Television Movie Golden Globe winners
Emmy Award-winning programs
Films about intellectual disability
Films directed by Anthony Page
Films set in Minnesota
Peabody Award-winning broadcasts
Alan Landsburg Productions films
American drama television films
1980s American films